The 2012 Aircel Chennai Open was a 2012 ATP World Tour tennis tournament, played on outdoor hard courts. It was the 17th edition of the only ATP tournament taking place in India and took place at the SDAT Tennis Stadium in Chennai, India. It was held from 2 to 8 January 2012. Stanislas Wawrinka was the defending singles champion coming into the tournament but was knocked out in the quarterfinals. Former champion Marin Čilić was originally in the field as the 4th seed before pulling out with a patellar tendon injury. Finally, fourth seed Milos Raonic from Canada defeated world no. 9 and top seeded Serb Janko Tipsarević to win only his second ATP title. Raonic became the first player since Roger Federer in 2008 to win an ATP title without losing a serve. The doubles title went to the Indo-Serb pair of Leander Paes and Janko Tipsarević after they defeated the Israeli pair of Jonathan Erlich and Andy Ram.

ATP singles main-draw entrants

Seeds

 Rankings as of 26 December 2011

Other entrants
The following players have been announced as part of the singles main draw:
Wild Cards
  Yuki Bhambri
  David Goffin
  Vishnu Vardhan

The following players received entry from the qualifying draw:
  Yūichi Sugita
  Go Soeda
  Thiemo de Bakker
  Vasek Pospisil

The following player received entry as Lucky loser:
  Édouard Roger-Vasselin

Withdrawals
  Marin Čilić (patellar tendon injury)
  Robin Haase (injury)
  Somdev Devvarman (right shoulder injury)

Retirements
  Steve Darcis (right shoulder injury)

ATP doubles main-draw entrants

Seeds

 Rankings are as of 26 December 2011

Other entrants
The following pairs received wildcards into the doubles main draw:
  Mohit Mayur Jayaprakash /  Ramkumar Ramanathan
  Sriram Balaji /  Jeevan Nedunchezhiyan

The following pair received entry as alternates:
  Vasek Pospisil /  Milos Raonic

Withdrawals
  Somdev Devvarman (right shoulder injury)

Finals

Singles

 Milos Raonic defeated  Janko Tipsarević, 6–7(4–7), 7–6(7–4), 7–6(7–4)

Doubles

 Leander Paes /  Janko Tipsarević defeated  Jonathan Erlich /  Andy Ram, 6–4, 6–4

References

External links
Official website

 
Aircel Chennai Open
Aircel Chennai Open
Chennai Open
January 2012 sports events in India